Badenscoth is a rural area near Auchterless in Aberdeenshire, Scotland.

References

Villages in Aberdeenshire